Cândido Plácido Fernandes de Oliveira (24 September 1896 – 23 June 1958) was a Portuguese football player, coach, and sports journalist.

The trophy Supertaça Cândido de Oliveira is named after him.

Life and career
Oliveira was educated at Casa Pia. He played for Benfica from 1911 to 1920, moving then to Casa Pia in 1920, of which he was one of the founders. He had his only cap for the Portugal national team, in the first game ever of the Selecção das Quinas, on 18 December 1921, a 1–3 loss to Spain in Madrid, a game which he captained.

Oliveira was also a coach of Sporting and was in charge, for several times, of the Portugal national squad, including at the 1928 Olympics.

He was one of the founders of the sports newspaper A Bola in 1945. He also published several books about football.

His opposition to the Portuguese dictatorship landed him several stays in prison, including an imprisonment at the infamous Tarrafal prison.

Death
Oliveira died on 23 June 1958 in Stockholm, Sweden, of lung disease when he was covering the 1958 FIFA World Cup for A Bola. He felt ill a few days before, and even received hospital care, but his spirit of mission brought him back to the stadiums and when he returned to the hospital it was too late.

References

1890s births
1958 deaths
People from Fronteira, Portugal
Portuguese footballers
Association football midfielders
S.L. Benfica footballers
Casa Pia A.C. players
Portugal international footballers
Portuguese football managers
Portugal national football team managers
Sporting CP managers
C.F. Os Belenenses managers
CR Flamengo managers
FC Porto managers
Associação Académica de Coimbra – O.A.F. managers
Portuguese expatriate football managers
Portuguese expatriate sportspeople in Brazil
Expatriate football managers in Brazil
Portuguese journalists
Male journalists
Portuguese anti-fascists
Deaths from lung disease
20th-century journalists